Gaston County Courthouse is a historic courthouse building located at Gastonia, Gaston County, North Carolina.  It was designed by Milburn, Heister & Company in 1909 and built in 1910. It is a three-story, rectangular, Classical Revival style tan brick building with a rear addition.  It features pedimented porticoes supported by Ionic order columns, a heavy modillion and dentil cornice, and three-sided pavilions on the side elevations.  The building was renovated in 1954.

It was listed on the National Register of Historic Places in 1979. It is located in the Downtown Gastonia Historic District.

References

County courthouses in North Carolina
Courthouses on the National Register of Historic Places in North Carolina
Neoclassical architecture in North Carolina
Government buildings completed in 1910
Buildings and structures in Gaston County, North Carolina
National Register of Historic Places in Gaston County, North Carolina
Individually listed contributing properties to historic districts on the National Register in North Carolina
1910 establishments in North Carolina